Cheonbuk-myeon is a myeon, or township, in the administrative subdivisions of the Gyeongju City, North Gyeongsang province, South Korea. It is bordered by Pohang city to the east, Bodeok-dong to the south, Angang-eup and Hyeongok-myeon to the Hyeongsan River to the west and Gangdong-myeon to the north. Its  are home to about 6,140 people. There are two elementary schools and one high school.

Administrative divisions
Galgok-ri (갈곡리)
Deoksan-ri (덕산리)
Dongsan-ri (동산리)
Moa-ri (모아리)
Mulcheon-ri (물천리)
Seongji-ri (성지리)
Sinang-ri (신당리)
Oya-ri (오야리)
Hwasan-ri (화산리)

See also
Subdivisions of Gyeongju
Administrative divisions of South Korea

References

External links
 The official site of the Cheonbuk-myeon office

Subdivisions of Gyeongju
Towns and townships in North Gyeongsang Province